Delroy Chuck  is a Jamaican lawyer, journalist and politician. He is currently (2016) the Member of Parliament (MP) for the constituency of Saint Andrew North Eastern and the Minister of Justice. Chuck previously served as the Minister of Justice from 2011 to 2012 and as the Speaker of the House of Representatives from 2007 to 2011. He joined the Jamaica Labour Party in 1995 and first contested St. Andrew North Eastern seat in 1997, an election in which he was victorious. He has held his seat ever since and won his fifth term in Parliament in 2016.

Background and early life
Delroy Chuck is of Hakka ancestry, Delroy Chuck's birthplace is Christiana in the parish of Manchester, but he grew up in Clarendon.

Education
He attended Ritchies Primary School, Clarendon, from 1955 to 1962, where he was successful in his Common Entrance Examination.  He attended Kingston College from 1962 to 1969.  During his tenure at Kingston College, he served as deputy head boy, president of Interact Club and was an active member of the chess and lawn tennis clubs and represented his school in both sports. He left Kingston College with five 'A' levels and a scholarship to University of the West Indies, where he earned a BSc (Hons) in special mathematics.  In 1972, Chuck was elected the 1973 Jamaica's Rhodes Scholar and attended St Catherine's College, Oxford, from 1973 to 1976, where he studied Law and graduated with a B.A. in jurisprudence and a Bachelor of Civil Law degree.

References

External links
Official site

20th-century Jamaican lawyers
Jamaican journalists
Male journalists
Jamaican people of Chinese descent
Year of birth missing (living people)
Living people
People from Manchester Parish
Members of the House of Representatives of Jamaica
Speakers of the House of Representatives of Jamaica
Jamaica Labour Party politicians
Alumni of St Catherine's College, Oxford
Justice ministers of Jamaica
Jamaican Queen's Counsel
Members of the 13th Parliament of Jamaica
Members of the 14th Parliament of Jamaica